There is a widespread and long-lasting myth alleging that homosexuals were numerous and prominent as a group in the Nazi Party or the identification of Nazism with homosexuality more generally. It has been promoted by various individuals and groups both before and after World War II, especially by left-wing Germans during the Nazi era and the Christian right in the United States more recently. Although some gay men joined the Nazi Party, there is no evidence that they were overrepresented. The Nazis harshly criticized homosexuality and severely persecuted gay men, going as far as murdering them en masse. Therefore, historians regard the myth as having no merit.

Background

In Nazi Germany, homosexuals were persecuted. About 100,000 were arrested, 50,000 convicted and some 5,000 to 15,000 interned in Nazi concentration camps, where they were forced to wear pink triangle badges. Some underwent castration or other Nazi human experimentation aimed at "curing" homosexuality. Adolf Hitler signed an edict that SS and police personnel would be subject to capital punishment if caught engaging in homosexual activity.
According to Laurie Marhoefer, a small number of gay men belonged to a covert faction within the Nazi party that favored gay emancipation while denigrating feminists, Jews, and leftists. Nazi propaganda asserted that "homosexual emancipation was a Jewish conspiracy to undermine the German Volk's morality". In 1928, the Nazi Party responded to a question about their position on Paragraph 175, the German law criminalizing homosexuality, writing that "Anyone who even thinks of homosexual love is our enemy."

History

Origins

The myth is nearly as old as the Nazi party itself. The Social Democratic Party of Germany (SPD) and Communist Party of Germany (KPD) were the primary supporters of repealing Paragraph 175, the German law criminalizing homosexuality, but they also opportunistically used accusations of homosexuality against political opponents. Contemporaries noted the hypocrisy of this approach. Historian Christopher Dillon comments, "While far from German Social Democracy's finest hour morally... it was a shrewd tactic politically". Confronted with the rise of Nazism, they exploited a stereotype associating homosexuality with militarism that had been established during the Eulenburg affair and exploited the homosexuality of a few Nazis, especially Ernst Röhm, for propaganda. For example, in 1927, SPD deputies heckled Nazi deputy Wilhelm Frick, shouting "Hitler, heil, heil, heil. Heil Eulenburg!" after Frick called for harsh penalties for homosexuality. In 1931, the SPD revealed Röhm's homosexuality in an effort to prevent or delay the Nazi seizure of power at a time when the defenders of Weimar democracy sensed that they were running out of options.

The worldwide bestseller The Brown Book of the Reichstag Fire and Hitler Terror (1933)—a brainchild of KPD politician Willi Münzenberg—claimed that Röhm's assistant , who was murdered in early 1933 in Austria, had been his pimp and had procured Reichstag arsonist Marinus van der Lubbe for Röhm. The book claimed that a clique of homosexual stormtroopers led by Heines set the Reichstag fire; van der Lubbe remained behind and agreed to accept the sole blame because of his desperation for affection; Bell was killed to cover it up. There was no evidence for these claims, and in fact Heines was several hundred kilometers away at the time. Nevertheless, the matter was so politically explosive that it was aired at van der Lubbe's trial in Leipzig. Wackerfuss states that Reichstag conspiracy appealed to antifascists because of their preexisting belief that "the heart of the Nazis' militant nationalist politics lay in the sinister schemes of decadent homosexual criminals". 

Speculation on the supposed homosexuality of various Nazi leaders, especially Rudolf Hess, Baldur von Schirach, and Hitler himself, was popular in the media of the exiled German opposition. In the Soviet Union, Maxim Gorky claimed that "Eradicate homosexuals and fascism will disappear". Leftists, even those who were themselves gay, continued to hold an aversion to all non-monogamous or non-heterosexual sex. Gay antifascists had to stay in the closet in order to avoid rejection by their movement. 

Hitler exaggerated the homosexuality in the SA in order to justify the 1934 purge of the SA leadership (the Night of Long Knives). According to British historian Daniel Siemens, it was the Nazis, not the left, who were most responsible for the lasting impression of the SA as homosexual.

Other anti-Nazis, such as Kurt Tucholsky writing in the left-liberal  in 1932, rejected the idea of attacking opponents for their personal lives. Regarding the Röhm scandal, he commented, "We fight the scandalous §175, everywhere we can, therefore we must not join the choir of those among us who want to banish a man from society because he is homosexual." German writer Klaus Mann (himself homosexual) wrote in a polemical essay, "'Vice' and the Left" (1934), that homosexuals had become the "Jews of the antifascists". He also denounced the equation of the fascist  and homosexuality. Mann concluded: 

Although Mann was one of the most prominent intellectuals among exiled Germans, his essay was ignored.

Germany's National Vice
In 1945, Samuel Igra, a German Jew who had spent the war in England,  published a book, Germany's National Vice, claiming that "there is a causal connection between mass sexual perversion" and German war crimes during both world wars. This was a new element not present in the 1930s antifascist discourse. Igra approvingly quoted British diplomat Robert Smallbones, who wrote in 1938 that "The explanation for this outbreak of sadistic cruelty may be that sexual perversion, in particular homo-sexuality, are very prevalent in Germany." He argued that since both Judaism and Christianity have traditionally condemned homosexuality, "the Jews were the natural enemies of homosexual Nazi leaders such as Hitler and Röhm". Igra wrote:

British scholar Gregory Woods describes Igra's book as "a sustained and obsessive pursuit of the myth of Fascistic homosexuality". Igra's argument is undermined by his failure to explain the Nazi persecution of homosexuals or to justify his claim that homosexuality increases antisemitism. According to Woods, Igra's claims have "reappeared at regular intervals ever since the war".

Postwar literature and film
Historian and sociologist Harry Oosterhuis identified the movies The Damned by Luchino Visconti (1969), The Conformist by Bernardo Bertolucci (1971), Salò or the 120 Days of Sodom by Pier Paolo Pasolini (1975), and The Tin Drum by Volker Schlöndorff (1978) as repeating the trope of a connection between homosexuality and Nazism. He also identifies Theodor W. Adorno, Maria Antonietta Macciocchi, and Reimut Reiche as writers who employ this trope. Susan Sontag also claimed that "there is a natural link" between fascism and sadomasochism between men.

Anti-LGBT activism

Pat Robertson also promoted the idea of gay Nazis, claiming that "Many of those people involved with Adolf Hitler were satanists. Many of them were homosexuals. The two seem to go together". The idea was promoted in the 1995 book The Pink Swastika: Homosexuality in the Nazi Party by Scott Lively and Kevin Abrams. The alleged connection between homosexuality and Nazism has attained some popularity on the American right, being promoted by such groups as the American Family Association. In 1993, the Family Research Institute sent out a newspaper asking "Was the Young Hitler a Homosexual Prostitute?", citing Igra's book as proof that Hitler was a homosexual before his rise to power. The anti-gay advocacy group Oregon Citizens Alliance claimed: 

In 2015, statements that LGBT activists were "jack-booted homofascist thugs" and that Hitler was a homosexual were among the controversies that led to Republican National Committee official Bryan Fischer being fired. Fischer also claimed that the Nazi party was founded at "a gay bar in Munich", that only Nazis who were "hardcore homosexuals" could advance in the party ranks, and that "Homosexual activists... [will] do the same thing to you that the Nazis did to their opponents in Nazi Germany". During the 2015 Irish referendum on same-sex marriage, psychologist and No advocate Gerard van den Aardweg "claimed the Nazi party was 'rooted' in homosexuals". In Death of a Nation, a 2018 film praised by Donald Trump Jr., Dinesh D'Souza claimed that Hitler did not persecute homosexuals in Nazi Germany.

Reception

Historicity

American sociologist Arlene Stein acknowledges that while there was a degree of homoeroticism in Nazi  sports and physical culture, which was channeled into "militarism, brutality, and ideological fixations on powerful leadership figures," this does not prove revisionist claims. She notes that the Nazis "identified homosexuality with the emasculation of men", which threatened the traditional family praised in Nazi propaganda.  The German sociologist Erwin J. Haeberle wrote: "It is often assumed by casual students of Nazism that Hitler and many Nazi leaders were originally quite tolerant of homosexuality, that the entire SA leadership, for example, was homosexual, and that the intolerance set in only after the murder of Rohm and his friends in 1934. However, all these assumptions are false."

There is no evidence that homosexuals were overrepresented in the Nazi Party, which Siemens considers unlikely because of the Nazis' homophobic politics. Historian Laurie Marhoefer concludes: "Although remarkably long-lived, mutable, capable of regenerating itself in various contexts, and even entertained at times by reputable historians, the myth of legions of gay Nazis has no historical basis".

According to American historian Andrew Wackerfuss in the book Stormtrooper Families, both Hitler and Lively endorsed the idea that there was a "sinister, scheming cult" within the SA which was "responsible for fascism’s excesses", but in fact homosexual SA members were located within broader heterosexual networks and were not especially evil. Wackerfuss emphasizes that "The vast majority of homosexuals have been antifascist, while the vast majority of fascists have been heterosexuals", and that there is nothing inherently fascist about homosexuality or vice versa. Writing in Journal of the History of Sexuality, Erik N. Jensen regards the linkage of homosexuality and Nazism as the recurrence of a "pernicious myth... long since dispelled" by "serious scholarship". In the 1970s, gays and lesbians began to use the pink triangle as a symbol, partly as an attempt to rebut "the vicious, influential myth created by antifascists that Nazis were themselves, in some basic way, homosexual", in the words of historian Jonathan Ned Katz. Historian Jonathan Zimmerman described the claim that "gay people helped bring Nazism to Germany" as "a flat-out lie".

In 2014, German cultural historian Andreas Pretzel wrote that "The Fantasy Echo of gay Nazis, which has been used for decades to marginalize and discredit homosexual persecution, has largely faded away. The implicit allegation of the collective guilt of the persecuted homosexuals has thus become part of the history of the reception of the Nazi homosexual persecution." In contrast, Siemens wrote in 2017 that "the cliché of the 'gay Nazi' is still firmly embedded in the cultural imagery of the Nazi movement".

Purpose
Wackerfuss argues that by "equating sexual deviance and political deviance", readers can "rest comfortably in a naïve belief that their societies, their social circles, and they themselves can never fall into fascist temptations". In his view, "the image of the gay Nazi therefore has very real consequences for modern politics" despite the rarity of actual gay Nazis. According to Stein, contemporary proponents of the gay-Nazi theory on the religious right have four main goals: 
strip gays of their "victim" status to decrease public support for LGBT rights
drive a wedge between LGBT and Jewish voters, both traditionally progressive groups
create a parallel between conservative Christians and Jews
legitimize the idea that Christians are oppressed in the United States

Notes

References

Sources

Further reading

External links
Germany's National Vice, full text
 site by German journalist Alexander Zinn

Anti-fascism
LGBT in Nazi Germany
Pseudohistory
1920s in Germany
1930s in Germany
Modern history of Germany
Nazism
LGBT-related conspiracy theories
LGBT politics